Maria-Therese Christina Lundqvist (born August 23, 1990 in Uppsala) is a Swedish clay pigeon shooter. She is member of Uppsala JSK and is trained by her father Gert-Ove Lundqvist.

Lundqvist qualified for the 2012 Olympic Games, and finished 7th in the skeet event.  She had previously won the world junior event in that weapon in 2009.  She also won the European junior event that year.

References

External links
Official website
Therese Lundqvist on the Swedish Olympic Committee's website

Sportspeople from Uppsala
Living people
1990 births
Swedish female sport shooters
Shooters at the 2012 Summer Olympics
Olympic shooters of Sweden
European Games competitors for Sweden
Shooters at the 2015 European Games
21st-century Swedish women